Kahran or Kohran may refer to:
 Kahran, Ardabil
 Kahran, East Azerbaijan